Lionheart, Lion Heart, Lionsheart or Lion's Heart may refer to:

People
Richard the Lionheart, a name for Richard I of England
Dan Wheldon (1978–2011), race car driver who was nicknamed "Lionheart"
Lion-Heart, nickname of English professional kickboxer Abdul Ali (born 1969), also known as Ali Jacko
Lionheart, nickname of Anthony Smith (born 1988), a mixed martial artist
Lionheart, a former ringname of professional wrestler Chris Jericho
Lionheart (UK wrestler) (1982–2019), ring name of British professional wrestler Adrian McCallum

Music
Lionheart (British band), a British rock band
Lionheart (American band), an American hardcore band
Lionsheart, a British heavy metal band
Lionheart Music Group, a Swedish record label

Albums
Lion Heart (album), by South Korean girl group Girls' Generation, 2015
Lionheart (Saxon album), 2004
Lionhearts, album by Maddy Prior, 2003
Lionheart, album by Noel Richards, 1989
Lionheart (Kate Bush album), 1978

Songs
"Lionheart", by Demi Lovato on her 2015 album Confident
"Lionheart", by Battle Beast on their 2015 album Unholy Savior
"Lionheart", by Blind Guardian on their 2006 album A Twist in the Myth
"Lionheart", by PUP on their self-titled 2013 album PUP
"Lionheart (Fearless)", by Joel Corry and Tom Grennan 2022
"Lion Heart" (song), by Girls' Generation
 "Lion Heart", by Swiss heavy metal band Krokus from their 1995 album To Rock or Not to Be
 "Heart of a Lion" (song), 1986 song released in 2004 by Judas Priest, off the album Metalogy

Film and television
Heart of a Lion, a 2013 Finnish film
Lionheart (1968 film), a film directed by Michael Forlong
Lionheart (1987 film), a film directed by Franklin J. Schaffner
Lionheart (1990 film), a film starring Jean-Claude Van Damme
Lionheart (2016 film), an American boxing film short
Lionheart (2018 film), a Nigerian feature film directed by Genevieve Nnaji
The Lionhearts, 1998 American animated series
Lion's Heart, a 1972 Hong Kong film
Lion.Hearts, a 2009 Chinese language TV series
"Lionheart", the first episode of Power Rangers Wild Force

Literature
Lionheart (comics), a Marvel Comics character
 Lionheart, a DC Comics character in the "Bloodlines" crossover
 Lionheart, a comic serial by Tom Stazer, featured in Fantagraphics Books' Critters series
 Lionheart, a historical novel by American author Sharon Kay Penman about the life of Richard I of England
 The Brothers Lionheart, a fantasy novel for children by Astrid Lindgren

Video games
Lionheart (video game), a 1993 platform-genre video game
Lionheart: Legacy of the Crusader, a 2003 video game
Lionheart: Kings' Crusade, a 2010 video game

Other uses
Lionheart Radio, a community radio station
 Lion's Heart (organization), a teen-based volunteer program headquartered in California
 Lionheart (yacht), a yacht owned by Sir Philip Green
 Griffon Lionheart, an airplane modeled after the Beechcraft Staggerwing

See also 

 
 
 
 
 
 Heart (disambiguation)
 Lion (disambiguation)